James Henry Lawrence (1773–1840) was a British writer. He is known for his utopian novel The Empire of the Nairs, or the Rights of Women, which appeared in English in 1811. It was influenced by the political writing of Mary Wollstonecraft and William Godwin.

Life
He was the son of Richard James Lawrence, a slave-owner of Fairfield, Jamaica, He was educated at Eton College, where he was Montem poet in 1790. He then studied in Germany, at the University of Göttingen.

Lawrence led an itinerant life, mainly in continental Europe. In 1803, in France with his father, he was arrested, along with other English residents and tourists, and was detained for several years at Verdun. He escaped by passing himself off as an Austrian. He received compensation for the Fairfield estate, under the Slave Compensation Act 1837.

Lawrence died unmarried 26 September 1840, and was interred with his father in the burying-ground of St. John's Wood Chapel. He claimed to be a Knight of Malta, and was known as the Chevalier Lawrence.

Works
The "utopian romance" The Empire of the Nairs, Lawrence's major work, developed in stages. In 1793 he published in Der Teutsche Merkur an essay on the Nair castes of Malabar, examining their customs of marriage and inheritance. In 1800 Lawrence completed a novel on the topic, in German. It was published in the Journal der Romane the following year, as Das Paradies der Liebe, then reprinted as Das Reich der Nairen. The book was subsequently translated into French and English by the author, and published in both versions; the English translation, as The Empire of the Nairs (1811), was much modified from the original, and had an introduction advocating the customs. The content is a description of a search for sexual freedom and independence for women.

Percy Bysshe Shelley wrote to Lawrence about the book, in 1812. Aaron Burr admired it, and called on Lawrence in London. Other works were:

A Picture of Verdun, or the English detained in France (London 1810, 2 vols.) 
On the Nobility of the British Gentry (1824, 4th ed. 1840)
The Etonian out of Bounds (1828), a collection of writings.

Notes

External links
Attribution

1773 births
1840 deaths
People educated at Eton College
University of Göttingen alumni
British male novelists
British essayists
British slave owners
19th-century British writers